Sameer Nair (born 1965) is an Indian media executive and business professional currently serving as CEO of Applause Entertainment Limited. He helped revamp the Star India, Star One, Star Utsav, Star Gold, Star Vijay and Channel V television networks and participated in the launch of the Kaun Banega Crorepati, and Balaji Telefilms' soap operas on Star Plus.

Personal life

Nair received his Higher Secondary Certificate from Wilson High School in Mumbai. From 1982 to 1984, he studied physics at St. Xavier's College, Mumbai. He later earned his bachelor's degree in economics from the University of Madras via correspondence courses while studying hotel management from the Institute of Hotel Management, Catering Technology and Applied Nutrition, Mumbai. Alongside these fields, he studied Indian history and politics. The interests lead him to join the Aam Adami Party (AAP)

Career

In his initial career he spent 2 years in Yellow Pages in Mumbai and 4 years in Advertising & Film making with Goldwire in Chennai. Sameer entered the nascent television industry in the early 90s with STAR India Network taking charge of Star Movies, the only English movie channel in India.  Over a 12-year career at STAR India Network, he worked at acquisitions, networking, and promotions, he was also the programming head of Star Plus,Executive Vice President, and as the Chief Operating Officer (overseeing Content, Communication, Advertising Sales and Distribution) in 2002, and Chief Executive Officer in 2006. 

In 2007, Sameer began working with NBC Universal to establish NDTV Imagine Ltd. This corporation sought to introduce  mythology and historical programming into daily primetime schedules. In August 2017, Sameer began  a new professional journey to helm Applause Entertainment - a Media, Content & IP Creation Studio - promoted by Aditya Birla Group chairman - Kumar Mangalam Birla.

References

External links 
Sameer Nair at LinkedIn

1965 births
Living people
Indian chief executives
Businesspeople from Mumbai
St. Xavier's College, Mumbai alumni
Indian television executives
University of Madras alumni